LG3 or variation, may refer to:

 La Grande-3 generating station (LG-3), Quebec, Canada
 Lehrgeschwader 3 (LG 3), WWII German Luftwaffe air wing; that became Gruppe II of Kampfgeschwader 1
 Gibson LG-3 acoustic guitar, see Gibson L Series
 Chevrolet LG3, a Chevrolet small-block engine
 Buick LG3, a Buick V6 engine
 Laminin G domain 3 (LG3)
 Lower Group 3, of the Bushveld Igneous Complex
 Xiaan metro station (station code LG03) on the Wanda–Zhonghe–Shulin line in Taipei, Taiwan
 Balvi District (LG03), Latvia; see List of FIPS region codes (J–L)

See also

 LG (disambiguation)
 IG3
 1G3